Saroba is a village, union council, and administrative subdivision of Jhelum District in the Punjab Province of Pakistan. It is part of Pind Dadan Khan Tehsil.

Location 
Saroba Punjab is located approximately (184 km) kilometres south of Islamabad in Pakistan.

Saroba Railway Station Main 
Saroba railway station.

Income 
Agriculture is the usual source of income.

Education 

Government high school Saroba
Government Girls high school Saroba

Population 
Approximately 7000 people reside in this town.

Languages 
The language spoken in Saroba Punjab is Punjabi with a blend of many dialects such as Wanhari, Pothohari and Lunhari.

References 

Populated places in Tehsil Pind Dadan Khan
Villages in Union Council Tobah